Lesbian, gay, bisexual, and transgender (LGBT) persons in the Democratic Republic of the Congo face legal challenges not experienced by non-LGBT residents. Same-sex sexual activity is legal for both males and females in the Democratic Republic of the Congo (DRC), although LGBT individuals may still be targeted for prosecution under public indecency provisions on occasion. 

Homosexuality is generally considered immoral, a view espoused and promoted by church groups influential within the DRC. LGBT persons experience discrimination and hostility and are commonly stigmatised by the wider community and officials. Same-sex couples, and households headed by same-sex couples, are not eligible for the same legal protections available to opposite-sex couple.

Laws regarding same-sex sexual activity
Same-sex sexual activity is legal in the Democratic Republic of the Congo. Age of consent is equal, regardless of sex. Homosexual acts have never been explicitly outlawed in the country's history. Before the foundation of the state in 1960, the Democratic Republic of the Congo was ruled by the European colonial power Belgium. In Belgium, homosexual acts were decriminalized in 1794.

The U.S. Department of State's 2021 Human Rights Report found that individuals who publicly engaged in same-sex consensual activities, such as, for example, kissing, were sometimes prosecuted under public indecency provisions "which were rarely applied to opposite-sex couples."

Recognition of same-sex relationships
There is no legal recognition of same-sex unions. There has been a constitutional ban on same-sex marriage, since 2006. The first paragraph of article 40, in the current Congolese constitution, states that "Every individual has the right to marry the person of their choice, of the opposite sex".

Discrimination protections
There is no anti-discrimination law protecting sexual orientation.

Transgender rights

Trans women in the DRC are believed by many to be "sorcerers" and responsible for much of the country's ills, leading to significant violence and discrimination against them.

Living conditions
The U.S. Department of State's 2021 Human Rights Report found that:

In comparison, the State Department's report for 2010 said: "Homosexuality remained a cultural taboo, and while harassment by state security forces continued, there were no reports during the year of police harassing gays and lesbians or perpetrating or condoning violence against them."

Summary table

Public opinion 
In 2014, 98% of Congolese said they were against same-sex marriage while only 2% supported it.

See also

Human rights in the Democratic Republic of the Congo
LGBT rights in Africa

References

LGBT in the Democratic Republic of the Congo
Congo, Democratic Republic of the
Human rights in the Democratic Republic of the Congo
Law of the Democratic Republic of the Congo